is a manga series written by Tadashi Kawashima and illustrated by Adachitoka. The series premiered in Monthly Shōnen Magazine in April 2003. Kawashima finished the series on his sickbed in February 2010 and the final chapter was published in the March issue of the Monthly Shōnen Magazine, although he died soon after. The chapters were collected by Kodansha and released in 21 tankōbon bound volumes. Del Rey Manga licensed series for an English localization and released eight volumes. In July 2016, Kodansha USA took over North American release of the series digitally only. An anime adaptation for the series was planned and to be produced by Gonzo and co-produced by Anime International Company, but the adaptation was canceled due to Gonzo being delisted from the Tokyo Stock Exchange.

Plot
The series follows Taisuke Kanou, a teenage student in Japan who lives a normal life with his sister Yoko Kanou and his friend Hirose. The story begins when an alien being flies towards Earth after sensing life emanating from there. It is learned that the being, Akuro, is composed of souls who were granted immortality but preferred to die but could not do so without a body. These beings separate from each other and enter the bodies of humans in order to pursue death. As a result, a large number of people begin to commit suicide worldwide and the incident became known as Nightmare Week. The humans who resist Akuro's influence gain powers from their possession and become known as "Comrades."

When Taisuke's friend, Yuichi Hirose, discovers his powers he kidnaps his friend Megumi Ochiai and heads north to the heart of Akuro. Taisuke, obtaining his own powers, follows in an attempt to bring Hirose and Megumi back home. On his adventures, he is accompanied by comrades Yuta Takizawa and Nami Kusunoki. He tracks down Hirose to a lake where the latter absorbs Akuro's heart. Taisuke defeats Hirose by triggering a volcanic eruption, which apparently kills them both and destroys the heart.

Two years later Yuta and Nami learn from Aoi Tezuka and Jun Tezuka that Taisuke is alive. They meet Taisuke, who has been living with amnesia since his battle with Hirose. After regaining his memories, they learn from Yukie Tezuka that the army is holding the dormant Hirose. Together they set out to destroy him along with the heart. After several attempts at infiltrating the military compound, Hirose awakens and flees from the military base. Deducing Hirose's return to Japan, Taisuke and his friends prepare for the upcoming battle.

Eventually Hirose is defeated by Taisuke who is empowered by the piece of Akuro's heart. Akuro's consciences, Mitama, uses the Akuro heart pieces to gather and recompile Akuro. Hirose, acknowledging his crimes, has his soul accompany Akuro into space. As all the pieces of Akuro leave their hosts, comrades are rendered powerless once again and the world returns to peace.

Protagonists

Taisuke Kano
 is the main character of the series. He is haunted by guilt for his role in the accident that killed his parents. After his parents died, he was raised by his older sister, . Taisuke's ability is destruction and reconstruction. Though unable to fully use his reconstruction abilities, Taisuke is able to manifest his destruction abilities by emitting fire which permanently damages cells.

Yuta Takizawa
 is a young boy who gains his powers after his mother commits suicide in front of him. His power is isolation, cutting off objects from the outside world by creating psychic barriers of various sizes, for defensive purposes or trapping his opponents. After his mother's death, Yuta's father disowned him in fear of his powers and mistaking that Yuta killed his own mother. He journeys with Taisuke after witnessing his kindness and teaches him the basics on using his powers. After Taisuke's apparent death, Yuta resumes his daily life in the care of his grandparents.

Nami Kusunoki
 has the power to freeze water to form any shape she chooses, usually forming it into claws to augment her martial arts, and projecting them like knives to pierce and freeze her targets. Her younger brother, Satoru, was burned alive by Kanon's abilities leading to her hate of Comrades. She journeys with Taisuke and Yuta in search of Katsumata after learning Kanon had joined him. She gradually begins to develop a romantic interest towards Taisuke and begins to envy his and Megumi's relationship.

The Tezuka Family
 is the mother of the seven Tezuka children who each have separate fathers of different nationalities. Before "Nightmare Week" occurred, Yukie was a nomadic woman who traveled constantly leaving her children to live on their own. Upon acquiring a piece of Akuro's heart, Yukie is able to feel her families sadness due to her abandonment causing her to return to her family and taking a more maternal role. Using the powers of Akuro's heart, she is able to manipulate other people into her bidding. After Taisuke's battle with Hirose, she nurses him back to life. She is killed by Hirose when he awakens and had her piece of the heart stolen.

Her eldest son, is 28 years old, who took care of his younger siblings in Yukie's absence. Her second eldest son, is a 27 years old martial artist and a Comrade with the ability to manipulate electricity.  is the 16 years old daughter and a computer wiz. She controls the technical aspects of their operations.  is the second oldest daughter in the family and is 10 years old. She is Yuta's classmate and a Comrade with the ability to run at high speeds. The last 3 kids are Osomatsu, Karamatsu and Choromatsu (nicknames), and 5, 4 and 3 years old, respectively.

Antagonists

Yuichi Hirose
 was Taisuke's best friend. He is a timid and shy boy who is often bullied, but saved by Taisuke. After Nightmare Week, Hirose becomes a comrade allowing him to fire spheres which can annihilate anything. After he accidentally murders his bullies, Hirose is put into police custody where Katsumata brainwashes him into joining him to search for a piece of Akuro's Heart. He complies after kidnapping his childhood friend, Megumi. Upon absorbing the piece of Akuro's Heart, his body becomes intangible and he gains the desire to destroy all life on Earth.

Shigeki Katsumata
 is the lead investigator of Hirose's incident. He has a piece of Akuro's Heart allowing him to brainwash his minions which he uses to gather Comrades for Mitama's purposes. He is eventually revealed to be plotting Mitama's demise but his plan fails. He is then killed by Mitama who takes his Akuro Heart piece.

Katsumata's Comrades
Katsumata had recruited six other Comrades to journey with him on the expedition to Akuro's Heart.
  is an artist who loves drawing people he knows with the aim of knowing them better. His ability is to create pressurized bubbles which he can detonate at any time. After Taisuke and Hirose's apparent deaths, he defects from Katsumata's rankings. He later joins the Tezuka family in order to search for the heart. Yura is later killed by Hirose.
  is a Comrade with the ability to create wind blades to cut objects. He was tasked with murdering Taisuke by Katsumata, but ultimately fails. He commits suicide after giving in to Akuro's influences when Hirose absorbs a piece of Akuro's Heart.
  is an obese otaku with an inferiority complex. Okada's power is Shinigami's Contract, allowing him to create promises with others and when the promise is broken, results in their deaths. He also committed suicide after Hirose absorbs the Heart.
  is a selfish girl who goes through all lengths to have what she wants. She killed Nami's brother out of annoyance with her ability which allows her to detonate metallic objects. She dies after failing to absorb Akuro's Heart.
  is a Catholic priest whose ability allows him to petrify anything he touches. After petrifying a child he attempted to save during Nightmare Week, Asou begins to suffer from his mistake and is brainwashed by Katsumata to do his bidding. He commits suicide after Hirose's fusion with the Heart.
  was a young boy at Asou's church who became a Comrade with the ability to liquify himself. After Asou's death, he joins Kyouko Amamiya and Masashi Oda on their journey as reporters.

After Taisuke and Hirose's apparent deaths, Katsumata had brainwashed three other comrades to assist him and Mitama to find the other two pieces of Akuro's Heart.
  is a Comrade with the ability to enter and take over another person's body, killing them in the process. Under Katsumata's orders she infiltrates the American military to get closer to the heart, but is eventually killed by D2 and McPhearson after entering the body of his subordinate, D3. 
 is a muscular man who does menial tasks for Katsumata. He is able to control gravity. He is killed by Hirose after being ordered to take his piece of Akuro's Heart.
  is a mysterious man who is searching for the meaning of life. He has the ability to copy and retain another Comrade's power. After confronting Katsumata on his goals, his fate is left unknown.

Akuro
 is an alien being containing the souls of an advanced civilization that obtained immortality. Without a body, the souls were unable to die and searched for hosts in order to commit suicide. Mitama originally inhabits the body of an owl, and later is able to enter and animate a girl's corpse.

Military
 is the sergeant in charge of Akuro's heart. He is highly skilled and is able to kill Comrades though he possess none of their abilities. He is ruthless, viewing his subordinates as expendable once he no longer needs them. However, he risks his life to save D4. He eventually sides with Taisuke's group and helps leak military information to the public about "Power Users" under the pseudonym Clay. As the series progresses D2 and D3 are killed off.

He possesses a piece of Akuro's Heart. He was killed by Mitama and had his piece of the heart taken.

Other characters
Megumi Ochiai
 is Taisuke's childhood friend. After Hirose joins Katsumata, he kidnaps Megumi to be with her. She is eventually put under Katsumata's mind control making her subconsciously stay with the group. During the two year time skip, she lives with Katsumata and attends to Mitama's care in America.

Ryou Fukiishi
 is a truck driver that Taisuke encounters after just leaving his home in search of his friends. She leaves Yuta with her phone number so he can call her if he gets lonely as she bears a striking resemblance to Yuta's late mother. She has a husband and a daughter that she adores. She visits Taisuke's sister every year on his birthday.

Kyouko Amamiya and Masashi Oda
Upon learning the truth, they side with Taisuke and attempt to assist him anyway possible.

Manga
Alive: The Final Evolution, written by Tadashi Kawashima and illustrated by Adachitoka, premiered in Monthly Shōnen Magazine on April 5, 2003 and ended its run on February 6, 2010. The chapters were collected by Kodansha and released in tankōbon bound volumes in Japan. The first volume was released on November 17, 2003 and the final volume was released on May 17, 2010. Del Rey Manga licensed the series for an English release with the first volume released on July 31, 2007 and the eighth on November 24, 2009. Kodansha USA acquired the license and began releasing Alive: The Final Evolution volumes digitally in July 2016, with previously unpublished Volume 9 releasing in October 2016. The last volume was released in August 2017.

Volume list

Reception
The first volume was generally well received by reviewers. Manga Life's Dan Polley praised the plot for being different from normal Science fiction but still retained the core that appeals to fans of that genre. He also commented on how Adachitoka's art style suited the manga. Katherine Dacey of Pop Culture Shock also commended the plot for not showing the cause of the mass suicide which helps create a "deliciously creepy atmosphere". She described the first volume as "...a suspenseful, entertaining read that mixed teen angst and X-Files paranoia to good effect". Deb Aoki from About.com also praised the mixture of science fiction and high-school life but criticized the overused "shonen manga stereotypes". In his appendix to Manga: The Complete Guide, Jason Thompson commended the art style for being "...an attractive example of the Shonen Magazine house style, with photorealistic environments" and concluded the series to be "An above average “realistic superheroes” story.". Greg McElhatton from Read About Comics panned the volume for its muddled plot and how shock treatments appearing in quick succession lessen the shock effect of each event and stated the volume overall as a disappointment.

Carlo Santos of Anime News Network regards the series' plot pacing to be slow and commented on how the art style is too ordinary making most characters not stand out. He commended the psychological battle in volume 5 and praised Hirose's character transformation. Comics Worth Reading's Ed Sizemore review of the first eight volumes of the series was highly positive. He praised the slow-build storytelling by Tadashi Kawashima for being interesting and suspenseful and commends Taisuke Kano's to be an extremely believable character. He originally considered the art style unimpressive, but as the series continues, he notes that Adachitoka's art style improves immensely and compares it to Takeshi Obata's style. The improved art style is later praised for the character's emotion and body language and the fluid fight scenes.

References

External links
 Alive: The Final Evolution Manga Profile on About.com
 

2003 manga
Action anime and manga
Drama anime and manga
Del Rey Manga
Kodansha manga
Shōnen manga
Supernatural anime and manga